Levi March (1841 – May 7, 1933) was a politician and magistrate in Newfoundland. He represented Trinity in the Newfoundland House of Assembly in 1897 as a Conservative.

March worked in the family business established by Stephen March. He was elected to the assembly in 1897 but resigned after being named stipendiary magistrate for the Bay of Islands. March retired from that post in 1919. He died at Curling in 1933.

References 

Members of the Newfoundland and Labrador House of Assembly
1841 births
1933 deaths
Newfoundland Colony judges